A legislative snap election for the National Council in Austria was held on 28 September 2008. The previous election was held on 1 October 2006. The election (the 24th in Austrian history) was caused by the withdrawal of Austrian People's Party leader Wilhelm Molterer from the governing grand coalition (led by the Social Democratic Party of Austria) on 7 July 2008. Due to dissatisfaction with the grand coalition and the two main parties, it was widely expected to be a realigning election, with gains for the opposition and up to seven parties expected to be in the National Council after the election. The losses for the government parties (both the SPÖ and the ÖVP had the worst election result in history) resulted in strong gains for the far right, while neither the Liberal Forum nor the Citizens' Forum Austria (both of which were considered to have chances of gaining seats) gained as much as 2% of the vote, defying earlier expectations. The result of the election was seen as strong for the far-right and in support of Eurosceptics.

Molterer resigned as party chairman as a result of the losses suffered by the ÖVP and was replaced by environment minister Josef Pröll; the Greens' federal spokesman Alexander Van der Bellen (in office since 1997) also resigned and was replaced by his deputy, Eva Glawischnig. Due to the LIF's failure to enter parliament on its own, LIF founder Heide Schmidt and financier Hans-Peter Haselsteiner both declared their complete withdrawal from politics, and the LIF's fate was seen as uncertain. Shortly after the election, BZÖ leader and Carinthian governor Jörg Haider died in a car accident.

Opinion polling

~ Failed to collect the required signatures.
# Decided not to contest the election.

Kanzlerfrage (chancellor question)

* Westenthaler was polled instead of Haider before it was announced that Westenthaler would not be the leading candidate.

Koalitionsfrage (coalition question)

° The two types of grand coalition were not polled separately.

State polls

Kanzlerfrage (chancellor question)

Koalitionsfrage (coalition question)

References

External links

Bundesministerium für Inneres: Information on the 2008 National Council election
ORF: Site of the ORF on the 2008 National Council election
FM4: Site of FM4 on the 2008 National Council election
Neuwal: blog with interviews, polls and commentaries (Neuwal, "early whale", is a pun on Neuwahl, "early election".)
NSD: European Election Database – Austria publishes regional level election data; allows for comparisons of election results, 1991–2010

Political parties

Social Democratic Party of Austria (Sozialdemokratische Partei Österreichs)
Werner Faymann's website
Austrian People's Party (Österreichische Volkspartei)
Wilhelm Molterer's website
The Greens – The Green Alternative (Die Grünen – Die Grüne Alternative)
Alexander Van der Bellen's website
Freedom Party of Austria (Freiheitliche Partei Österreichs)
Heinz-Christian Strache's website
Alliance for the Future of Austria (Bündnis Zukunft Österreich)
Liberal Forum (Liberales Forum)
Heide Schmidt's website
 supported by Unity List (Enotna lista/Einheitsliste)
Citizens' Forum Austria (Bürgerforum Österreich)
Communist Party of Austria (Kommunistische Partei Österreichs)
Save Austria (Rettet Österreich)
The Christians (Die Christen)

Left (Linke)
Animal Rights Party (Tierrechtspartei)
Dipl.-Ing. Karlheinz Klement
Pirate Party of Austria (Piratenpartei Österreichs)
Humans Austria (Menschen Österreich)
WE (WIR)
Democratic Diversity of Austria (Demokratische Diversität Österreichs)
plattform-direkt.at
The Whites of Austria (Die Weißen Österreichs)
I DON'T VOTE (ICH WÄHLE NICHT)
Certainly – Absolutely – Independent (Sicher – Absolut – Unabhängig)
Dr Martin's List (Liste Dr. Martin)
Neutral Free Austria (Neutrales Freies Österreich)
Party3 (Partei3)

Legislative election
Opinion polling in Austria